"Pussy Cats" Starring the Walkmen, often referred to as just Pussy Cats, is a cover album by The Walkmen, released in 2006. The album is a song-for-song cover of the 1974 Harry Nilsson album Pussy Cats which was produced by John Lennon.  The decision to cover the Pussy Cats album, which is a band favourite, started off as a joke that evolved into a full-fledged album released only 5 months after their previous record, A Hundred Miles Off. The album also served as a last project for the band's studio, Marcata Recording.  Marcata, which band members Matt Barrick, Paul Maroon and Walter Martin built in 1999, was located in a building owned by Columbia University, which took the property back in 2006.  The making of the album, which took "about ten days," was filmed by Norman "Rockwell" Coady and the footage was made into the documentary In Loving Recognition, included on the album's accompanying DVD.

Track listing

Personnel 

Matt Barrick – conga, drums, maracas, tambourine, cowbell, wood block
Peter Bauer – organ, farfisa organ, Vox Continental
Chris Colbert – engineer, mixing
Paul Gomez – A&R
Hamilton Leithauser – acoustic guitar, glockenspiel, electric guitar, vocals, handwriting
Dana Lyn – viola
Paul Maroon – piano, electric guitar
Walter Martin – acoustic guitar, bass, kazoo, maracas, organ, piano, tambourine, triangle, vibraslap, cowbell, fuzz bass, slide whistle
Kevin McMahon – engineer, mixing
Rob Moose – violin
Quentin Stoltzfus – vocals
Jordan Tappis – A&R
Elijah Thomson – assistant engineer, mixing assistant
Alex Waterman – cello, string arrangements
Tim Ruedeman- saxophone

References
 General
 Pussy Cats at Record Collection website
 Pussy Cats "Listening Pary" minisite
 In Loving Recollection making of the album documentary

Specific

The Walkmen albums
2006 albums
Record Collection albums